Taiyuan No. 5 Middle School (short form: , TYWZ) is a secondary school (junior and senior high school) in Taiyuan, Shanxi, China.

References

External links

 Taiyuan No. 5 Middle School 

Education in Taiyuan
High schools in Shanxi
Buildings and structures in Taiyuan
Junior secondary schools in China